The  is a railway line connecting Tokyo and Chiba in Japan, paralleling the edge of Tokyo Bay. It is operated by the East Japan Railway Company (JR East). The line forms part of what JR East refers to as the  around Tokyo, consisting of the Keiyō Line, Musashino Line, Nambu Line, and Yokohama Line. It provides the main rail access to the Tokyo Disney Resort and the Makuhari Messe exhibition center. The terminus at Tokyo Station is located underground, some distance to the south of the main station complex approximately halfway to Yūrakuchō Station. This means transferring between other lines at Tokyo Station can take between 15 and 20 minutes. It should not be confused with the Keiō Line, a privately operated commuter line in western Tokyo.

Services

 Keiyō Line "Local" (各駅停車 kakueki-teisha)trains stop at all stations between Tokyo and Soga except Nishi-Funabashi.
 Musashino Line ''Local'' through trains stop at all stations between Tokyo and Nishi-Funabashi before continuing to the Musashino Line. Some trains stop at Nishi-Funabashi, Minami-Funabashi, Shin-Narashino, and Kaihimmakuhari.
 Keiyō Line "Rapid" (快速 kaisoku) trains stop at Tokyo, Hatchōbori, Shin-Kiba, Maihama, Shin-Urayasu, Minami-Funabashi, Kaihimmakuhari, and all stops to Soga.
  trains stop at Tokyo, Hatchōbori, Shin-Kiba, and Soga.

Station list 
 All trains (except limited express services) stop at stations marked "●" and pass those marked "｜". Trains do not travel past those stations marked "∥".
 For the Wakashio and Sazanami limited express services, see their respective articles.

Rolling stock
All Keiyō Line and Musashino Line rolling stock is based at the Keiyō Rolling Stock Center near Shin-Narashino Station.

Keiyō Line 
209-500 series single 10-car EMU train set (magenta stripe) (since October 2008)
E233-5000 series 10-car EMUs (magenta stripe) (since 1 July 2010)

Musashino Line through services 

209-500 series 8-car EMUs (orange/brown stripe) (since 4 December 2010)
E231-0 series 8-car EMUs (orange/brown stripe) (since November 2017)
E231-900 series 8-car EMU (orange/brown stripe) (since 20 July 2020)

Former rolling stock

Keiyō Line 
103 series 4/6/10-car EMUs (sky blue livery) (from 1986 until November 2005)
165 series 3-car EMU (x1) Shuttle Maihama (from 1990 until 1995)
201 series 10-car EMUs (sky blue livery) (from August 2000 until 20 June 2011)
205-0 series 10-car EMUs (magenta stripe) (from March 1990 until 2011)
E331 series 14-car EMU (x1) (magenta stripe) (from March 2007 until 2011)

Musashino Line through services 
Inter-running from the Musashino Line to the Keiyō Line commenced on 1 December 1988.

103 series 6-car (later 8-car) EMUs (orange livery) (from 1 December 1988 - 8 December 2005)
201 series 6-car EMUs (orange livery) (from 1 December 1988 - November 1996)
205-0 series 8-car EMUs (orange/brown stripe) (from December 1991 - October 2019)
205-5000 series 8-car EMUs (orange/brown stripe) (from 2002 - 19 October 2020)

Timeline

History
The Keiyo Line was initially planned as a freight-only line. Its first section opened on 10 May 1975 as a  link between the Chiba Freight Terminal (now the Mihama New Port Resort between Inagekaigan and Chibaminato Stations) and the freight yard next to Soga Station.

The final section of the Keiyo Line between Tokyo and Shin-Kiba opened on 10 March 1990. The platforms at Tokyo Station were originally built to accommodate the Narita Shinkansen, a planned (but never built) high-speed rail line between central Tokyo and Narita International Airport.

Planners originally envisioned the Keiyo Line interfacing with the Rinkai Line at Shin-Kiba, thus providing a through rail connection between Chiba and the Tokyo Freight Terminal in eastern Shinagawa, and also completing the outer loop for freight trains around Tokyo formed by the Musashino Line. This original plan would also allow through service with the Tokaido Main Line, allowing freight trains from central and western Japan to reach Chiba and points east.

However, in the 1990s, as the artificial island of Odaiba began developing as a commercial and tourist area in the middle of the Rinkai Line route, the Rinkai Line was re-purposed for use as a passenger line. While there is a through connection between the Rinkai Line and the Keiyo Line, it is only used by passenger trains in charter service, usually carrying groups to the Tokyo Disney Resort.

Timeline

 10 March 1990: Third stage opened between  & Shin-Kiba; and the new Keiyo Line train, the 205 series, was also introduced to the public.
 16 March 1991: Sazanami and Wakashio limited express services are rerouted via the Keiyo Line.
 2 July 1993: 255 series EMUs are introduced on View Sazanami and View Wakashio limited express services.
 16 October 2004: E257-500 series EMUs are introduced on Sazanami and Wakashio limited express services.
 20 August 2016: Station numbering introduced with Keiyo Line stations being assigned station numbers between JE01 (Tokyo) and JE16 (Chibaminato).
 18 March 2023: Opening of Makuharitoyosuna Station between Kaihimmakuhari and Shin-Narashino, station numbers from Kaihimmakuhari to Chibaminato bumped up by one.

References

External links

 Stations of the Keiyō Line (JR East) 

 
Lines of East Japan Railway Company
Railway lines in Chiba Prefecture
Railway lines in Tokyo
1067 mm gauge railways in Japan
Railway lines opened in 1975